TAPI is a four-letter abbreviation, and may refer to:
Telephony Application Programming Interface, an API which enables PCs running Microsoft Windows to use telephone services 
Turkmenistan-Afghanistan–Pakistan–India pipeline (Trans-Afghanistan Pipeline), a proposed natural gas pipeline
Teva Active Pharmaceutical Ingredients, a stand-alone business unit of Teva Pharmaceutical Industries limited
TAPI-0 and TAPI-1, inhibitors used in biochemistry

Tapi may refer to:

People
Tapi Dharma Rao, Indian writer
Tapi Chanakya, Indian film director
Dragan Malesevic Tapi  (Dragan Malešević Tapi), Serbian hyper realist painter

Geography
Tapi, Albania
Tapi, Iran
Tapi, Pakistan, a village in the North Waziristan province and the site of two drone attacks by the United States military 
Used as TApI
Tapi district, Gujarat, India 
Tapti River (often spelled Tapi), in the state of Madhya Pradesh, Maharashtra and Gujarat in India
Tapi River, Thailand (Thai: ตาปี, sometimes spelled Tapee), in the Surat Thani Province, Southern Thailand